Martin Svědík (born 27 June 1974) is a Czech football manager and former player. He is currently the head coach of 1. FC Slovácko.

Playing career 
As a player, Svědík played as a forward. He started playing at the top level in the 1993–94 Gambrinus liga for FC Baník Ostrava before having brief spells in the top flight with SK Sigma MŽ Olomouc and AFK Atlantic Lázně Bohdaneč. He also played for the Czech Republic national under-21 football team between 1993 and 1994.

Management career 
Svědík took over at TJ Tesla Pardubice in 2007, while the club was in the Czech Fourth Division. Svědík led FK Pardubice, which had changed its name in 2010, to promotion from the Czech Fourth Division to the Bohemian Football League in 2010, with the club celebrating promotion five games before the end of the season. The club played in the Bohemian Football League for two seasons, before winning promotion to the Czech 2. Liga in 2012.

Honours

Managerial 
 FK Pardubice
 Bohemian Football League runner-up: 2011–12
 Czech Fourth Division: 2009–10

 1. FC Slovácko
 Czech Cup: 2021–22

References

1974 births
Living people
Czech footballers
Czech Republic under-21 international footballers
Czech First League players
FC Baník Ostrava players
SK Sigma Olomouc players
1. FK Příbram players
AFK Atlantic Lázně Bohdaneč players
Czech football managers
FC Baník Ostrava managers
FK Mladá Boleslav managers
FC Vysočina Jihlava managers
1. FC Slovácko managers
Association football forwards
FK Pardubice managers
Bohemian Football League managers
Czech National Football League managers